"Wind It Up (Rewound)" is a song by British electronica act the Prodigy, released as their fifth single on 5 April 1993. A remix of "Wind It Up", it is significantly different from the version featured on their debut album, Experience (1992), though does appear on CD2 of the Experience Expanded special edition. B-side "We Are the Ruffest" features a sped-up banjo riff. The Elektra Records version of the single in the United States was never re-released as some of the previous singles were, making it a rarity and much sought after. The Elektra version also exclusively contained four remixes never released on any other work by the band.

Critical reception
Andy Beevers from Music Week gave "Wind It Up (Rewound)" four out of five. He wrote, "Yet another track from their debut LP makes it on to the single format. It comes in remixed form with a new, similarly hard and fast breakbeat ragga rave tune, We Are The Ruffest, plus a new mix of the more experimental Weather Experience. The Prodigy should have enough support to take this chartwards but they will need to follow it with something fresher." Pete Stanton from Smash Hits rated the song two out of five, adding, "Wind It Up does wind you up really. It's like one of those Duracell teddies that bangs a drum for ever and ever and..."

Music video
The accompanying music video for the song features the band again on tour in the United States, as in the "Everybody in the Place" video, but this time on the West Coast. There is footage showing local flavour, the band in concert and on the beach.

Track listings
7-inch single

12-inch single

CD single

Elektra CD single: Track 2, 3, 4 and 7 remixed by Tony Garcia and Guido Osorio.

Charts

References

External links
 

The Prodigy songs
1992 songs
1993 singles
Songs written by Liam Howlett
XL Recordings singles